Burrage Dome is a mainly ice-covered dome,  high, standing  northeast of the summit of Mount Joyce, in the Prince Albert Mountains, Victoria Land. It was mapped by the United States Geological Survey from surveys and from U.S. Navy air photos, 1956–62, and named by the Advisory Committee on Antarctic Names for Roy E. Burrage, Jr., a construction mechanic with the South Pole Station winter party, 1966.

References 

Ice caps of Antarctica
Landforms of Victoria Land
Scott Coast